Corporation Bank was a public-sector banking company headquartered in Mangalore, India. The bank had a pan-Indian presence. Presently, the bank has a network of 2,432 fully automated CBS branches, 3,040 ATMs, and 4,724 branchless banking units across the country. In 2019, finance minister Nirmala Sitharaman announced that Corporation Bank and Andhra Bank would be merged into the Union Bank of India, with all their branches becoming branches of the latter on 1 April 2020.

History
Corporation Bank was founded on 12 March 1906 in Udupi, with  capital, Haji Abdulla Haji Khasim Saheb Bahadur as founding president,  and guided by the principles of the Swadeshi movement of Bal Gangadhar Tilak.
 

On 2 December 2017, Corporation Bank launched its RuPay Select and RuPay Platinum credit cards. RuPay credit cards are accepted at all RuPay-enabled 1.5 million-plus PoS terminals and 80,000-plus e-commerce merchants in India and all ICS Partner acceptance points (POS, e-commerce merchants) globally.

On 30 August 2019, Finance Minister Nirmala Sitharaman announced that Corporation Bank and Andhra Bank would be merged into Union Bank of India. The Board of Directors of Andhra Bank approved the merger on 13 September. The Union Cabinet approved the merger on 4 March, and it was  completed on 1 April 2020.

See also

Indian banking
List of banks in India
Economy of Mangalore

References

External links

Defunct banks of India
Indian companies established in 1906
Banks established in 1906
Banks disestablished in 2020
Indian companies disestablished in 2020
Companies formerly listed on the Bombay Stock Exchange
Companies nationalised by the Government of India
Banks based in Karnataka
Companies based in Mangalore
Companies listed on the National Stock Exchange of India
Companies listed on the Bombay Stock Exchange